= Katesar =

Tamil caste in south India

Katesan is a Tamil caste found in Tamil Nadu of India. They are chiefly found in the district of Thirunelveli in Tamil Nadu.

They have seven exogamous sub-divisions known as Keelai. In the war between the Idangai and Valangai, the Katesans sided with the Kammalar who belonged to the Idangais. The Katesans lost the battle with only seven men standing. Each men took wife from different castes and thereby forming a subdivision. The following subdivisions are Kuttini keelai ( from a Kusuvar woman), Nēttali keelai(from a Paravar woman), Kavadi keelai (from a Shanar woman), Nayinan Chakravarthi keelai ( from a Panar woman), Thomba Puluvan keelai ( from a Thomban woman), Attukkutti keelai ( from an Idaiyar woman) and Tachilai keelai( from a Vannar woman).

In the Katesan society, the maternal uncle's responsibility is more than the parents.

These are found in big temple, Tanjavur and in other places. "Perumal Patamkatti " dating 900 AD was found in Kanyakumari.

And the kadesar pattamkatti called him in the name of pattangkattiyar only

Then the kadesar pattamkatti and rameswaram pattangkattiyar are different family and don't compare with him. Kadesar pattamkatti community certificate issued by government by the backward community. But rameswaram pattangkattiyar is a schedule caste issue a community certificate by the tamilnadu government.
